Dave Carpender (January 23, 1950 – September 26, 2007) was an American musician best known as the guitarist for The Greg Kihn Band from 1976 to 1983. They had a #2 US /#63 UK hit in 1983 with "Jeopardy" and a #15 US hit in 1981 with "The Breakup Song (They Don't Write 'Em)". He died of heart failure in 2007, at age 57.

References

External links
AllMusic
Gregkihn.com

1950 births
2007 deaths
Musicians from Berkeley, California
20th-century American guitarists
Guitarists from California
American male guitarists
The Greg Kihn Band members
20th-century American male musicians